Wedge Group is a British Galvanizing Company that operates 14 facilities within the United Kingdom, and has several other interests internationally. It operates the largest Zinc bath in Britain and is one of the largest Galvanising companies in the UK. The company has been active since the 1850s. It currently services approximately 35% of the UK steel industry.

Steelwork galvanized by Wedge Group can be found on motorway networks, including road sign gantries, lighting columns, foot-bridges and safety-barriers, as well as, trackside railway equipment.

References

For more info please visit : http://www.construction.co.uk/c/179833/wedge-group

Manufacturing companies of the United Kingdom
Companies based in the West Midlands (county)
Companies established in 1876
1876 establishments in the United Kingdom